Ikaw Lamang (International title: No Greater Love / ) is a 2014 Philippine period drama television series, directed by Malu L. Sevilla and Avel E. Sunpongco, starring Kim Chiu and Coco Martin, together with an ensemble cast. The series was aired on ABS-CBN and worldwide on TFC from on network's Primetime Bida. It premiere March 10, 2014 to October 24, 2014, replacing Got to Believe and was replaced by Forevermore. 

The story of the entire first season followed the lives of Samuel (Coco Martin), Isabelle (Kim Chiu), Mona (Julia Montes) and Franco (Jake Cuenca) encompassing the period between 1964-1984. It ran from March 10, 2014 to August 15, 2014 with a total of 112 episodes.

In the second season, the story revolved around Gabriel (Coco Martin), Andrea (Kim Chiu), and Natalia (KC Concepcion) and is set in the year 2005, with brief flashbacks from the 1990s. It aired from August 18, 2014 to October 24, 2014 with only 50 episodes.

Plot

1950s
Eduardo Hidalgo (Tirso Cruz III), a wealthy landowner based in Salvacion, Negros Island, has a relationship with one of the workers in his plantation, Elena Severino (Cherry Pie Picache). However, when Maximo Salazar (Ronaldo Valdez), the butler in the hacienda of the Hidalgos, learns that Elena is pregnant, he manipulates a robbery in which Elena is unjustly implicated, causing her to be imprisoned only to be released on the condition that she leaves Salvacion. Eduardo marries Maximo's daughter Miranda (Cherie Gil), unaware that Elena is pregnant with her son with him. Elena and Miranda give birth to their respective children named Samuel and Franco, with the latter not being Eduardo's biological son but that of a beauty contest judge. Luis (William Lorenzo) assumes the role of a father to Samuel but dies later on. With a heavy heart, however, Elena and her family are forced to return to Salvacion in the years that follow.

1960s
In the era of the sugar industry boom in the small town of Salvacion, two children from opposite sides of society will meet: the young Samuel Severino (Zaijian Jaranilla) and Isabelle Miravelez (Alyanna Angeles). Samuel is the son of sugarcane plantation worker Elena, while Isabelle is the daughter of wealthy couple Gonzalo (John Estrada) and Rebecca Miravelez (Angel Aquino). Through Isabelle, Samuel meets Franco Hidalgo (Louise Abuel), the son of wealthy landowners Miranda and Eduardo. A natural-born farmer, Samuel teaches Franco how to plant sugar cane and in return, Franco teaches Samuel how to read.

One night, a wild fire strikes the sugar cane field. Amidst the tragedy, Samuel is able to save Isabelle. However, with the influence of his grandfather Maximo, Franco claims he was the one who saved Isabelle. Relentless in their pursuit to know the truth as to who was behind the fire, Gonzalo and his right-hand man Pacquito (Ronnie Lazaro) was able to pinpoint a farmer as the culprit. To prove that the farmer was innocent, Samuel reveals that he was there when the fire happened and told everyone that he was the one who saved Isabelle. This ignites a rivalry between Samuel and Franco.

1970s
After studying in London, Isabelle (Kim Chiu) and Franco (Jake Cuenca) return to Salvacion. Meanwhile, Mona Roque (Julia Montes), the loyal friend and secret admirer of Samuel (Coco Martin), also returns to Salvacion from Manila where she studied. Samuel, on the other hand, continues his fight for the injustices against the workers. In the midst of this social turmoil, love develops between Samuel and Isabelle, to the consternation of Franco and Mona.

A planned elopement and wedding between Samuel and Isabelle is foiled by Gonzalo and Maximo, in favor of Franco. Samuel is abducted, electrocuted and buried alive, but a priest saves him. Isabelle ends up marrying Franco. Mona seduces a drunk, heartbroken Samuel; their one night stand eventually results in their marriage and the birth of their son named Gabriel, while Isabelle and Franco are blessed with a daughter named Natalia Isabelle.

Things get worse when Eduardo reveals that he is the biological father of Samuel. In addition, Rebecca divulges Franco's real identity. Maximo accidentally kills Miranda during a gunfight between him and Gonzalo, and is subsequently imprisoned as a result.

Franco suffers an accident but despite recovering, he pretends to be crippled in order to gain the sympathy of others, especially Isabelle. Isabelle becomes pregnant with Franco's second child but Franco believes that this child is Samuel's. Franco is able to make Mona and the townspeople believe in a lie, causing a jealous Mona to flee Salvacion with Gabriel despite not having the permission of her family. Samuel catches up with them and joins them along with Lupe and Calixto to Manila. While in Manila, Samuel and Mona enter university while fulfilling their duties as Gabriel's parents at the same time.

Franco decides to run as Mayor of Salvacion, while Eduardo seeks another term as governor. They both emerge victorious.

1980s
The plantation workers hold massive protests against Franco, who was then the corrupt mayor of their town. Samuel is implicated in their so-called rebellion and is arrested and tortured, only to be released as Eduardo leads a hunger strike. Eduardo, who had remarried to Elena, supports their son's gubernatorial bid against Franco, who is backed by Maximo. During the election, Mona is killed in an ambush ordered by Maximo, who also helps Franco cheat his way to victory. Gonzalo anonymously divulges Maximo's dishonest acts, but is caught, captured, and beaten by the latter and his men.

Gonzalo manages to escape Maximo's men, and files cases against the old man. Maximo is captured and detained following a police operation. He had aimed his gun at Samuel but Eduardo was hit by the bullets and dies later that night. Maximo attempts to escape jail by bribing the police chief and faking his death, but his attempt becomes unsuccessful as Gonzalo and Pacquito intercept his hearse. Gonzalo opens Maximo's coffin and buries Maximo alive along with his gold bars and venomous snakes even as the latter pleads for his life and offers to pay him.

Before the protests and elections, Maximo is released as a result of a presidential pardon, and vows to bring down his rivals. He orders the burning of the Miravelez mansion. As a result, Isabelle prematurely gives birth to Andrea. However, Franco believes the child is Isabelle's illegitimate child with Samuel. Franco abuses Isabelle and uses his children to keep her from leaving.

To save Isabelle from Franco's battering, Samuel plans to flee to Manila with Natalia and Andrea.

Franco learns of the plan and manages to get Natalia from Isabelle. On the night of their elopement, Franco plants a bomb on the ship where Samuel, Isabelle, and their families and friends are taking going to Manila. The bomb explodes. Samuel, Isabelle, Gabriel, and Andrea find themselves losing their beloved ones and separated by fate. Gonzalo told Gabriel that he is the only one will end Franco's evilness for which he kept before looking for his father.

In the aftermath of the explosion, a dying Elena gives Andrea to Roger (Neil Coleta) and Esther Sanggalang (Marlann Flores) who then raise her; not knowing the real identity of the little girl, they name her Jacqueline after their deceased daughter. Elena, her parents Damian and Trinidad Severino, Gonzalo and Rebecca all perished in the ship explosion, and Gabriel is left to the care of Mona's sister Lupe Roque (Meryll Soriano) and her friend (and future husband) Calixto de la Cruz (Lester Llansang). Days later, an old lady finds Isabelle and takes care of her, while Samuel confronts Franco and is unjustly imprisoned for 20 years.

1990s
Lupe (Rio Locsin) and Calixto (Nonie Buencamino) moved to Manila along with Gabriel (Yogo Singh) and their newborn daughter Darlene, after learning that Franco had engaged in land grabbing of Samuel's properties. Gabriel grows to become a quarrelsome boy, planting the seeds of his revenge against Franco.

2000s
Franco (Christopher de Leon) walks away with impunity, having been elected as senator and interested in the presidency. Gabriel (Coco Martin) begins his revenge against him by sabotaging Natalia's (KC Concepcion) wedding to James (Bryan Santos) as he produces photos showing the latter flirting with another woman.

A kind-hearted jail warden named Roman (Dennis Padilla) helps Samuel (Joel Torre) escape from jail. Samuel eventually locates Calixto, Lupe, and Gabriel. In order to begin life anew and help Gabriel exact revenge against Franco, Samuel and Calixto briefly return to Salvacion to dig and sell the gold bars that were buried with Maximo when he was buried alive by Gonzalo and Pacquito before the ship explosion.

Isabelle (Amy Austria-Ventura), introducing herself as Dolores, helps Esther (Arlene Muhlach) after the latter collapses in a public market. She becomes friends with Esther and Roger (Smokey Manaloto), and later meets Jacq (Kim Chiu), whom she is able to recognize as her daughter Andrea.

Gabriel enters into a relationship with Natalia, only to destroy it later on in favor of Jacq – whose real identity Gabriel is not yet aware of – as part of his revenge against Franco. While courting Natalia, Gabriel follows her to Salvacion, accompanied by Jacq. Natalia informs her father's chief of staff and mistress Tessa (Mylene Dizon) about somebody who looks like her mother. The paths of Franco and Jacq then cross as a DNA test confirms a father-daughter relationship between them.

Franco holds a party introducing Andrea as his daughter. Isabelle sneaks into the party and Franco sees her, only for the former to make the latter believe that she has amnesia. Franco lets his wife and children live in the same home, but locks up Isabelle and Andrea to prevent them from escaping again. Natalia got into a fight with Isabelle and Andrea. Later on, Franco came and stopped it by slapping Natalia. Isabelle then tells Andrea the whole truth about herself and Franco. Unluckily, Tessa recorded their discussion in which they plan to escape with Natalia. Franco forces Isabelle to renew their vows, but Isabelle continues her act of fake amnesia, telling him that they should not go too fast into renewing the vows because it is a decision for two people. During this occasion, Samuel and Gabriel successfully rescue Andrea and Isabelle, but the following day, Natalia can only helplessly watch as Franco ruthlessly murders Samuel.

Charges of murder, falsification of documents, and domestic violence are filed against Franco, but despite a legislative inquiry and the issuance of a warrant of arrest against him by the NBI, he refuses to surrender, holding Andrea hostage. Remembering what Gonzalo said to him before his death, Franco and Gabriel go on a duel in a ship, but Franco falls off the ship to his death after getting pierced by the ship's anchor. In the end, Andrea marries Gabriel and it is implied that Gabriel has regained the land in Salvacion that Franco took away from his family.

Cast and characters

Book 1

Lead
 Coco Martin as Samuel S. Hidalgo
 Kim Chiu as Isabelle Miravelez-Hidalgo
 Jake Cuenca as Franco S. Hidalgo
 Julia Montes as Monalisa "Mona" Roque-Hidalgo

Main
 Cherie Gil as Señora Miranda Salazar-Hidalgo
 Cherry Pie Picache as Señora Elena Severino-Hidalgo
 Angel Aquino as Señora Rebecca Miravelez
 John Estrada as Don Gonzalo Miravelez
 Ronaldo Valdez as Don Maximo Salazar
 Tirso Cruz III as Gov. Eduardo Hidalgo

Supporting
 Daria Ramirez as Trinidad Severino
 Ronnie Lazaro as Pacquito Roque
 Spanky Manikan as Damian Severino
 Meryll Soriano as Guadalupe "Lupe" Roque
 Lester Llansang as Calixto Dela Cruz
 Simon Ibarra as Romeo Dela Cruz
 Tiya Pusit as Soledad
 Vangie Labalan as Conchita
 John Medina as Juancho

Guests
 William Lorenzo as Luis San Gabriel
 Marita Zobel as Victoria Miravelez 
 Melai Cantiveros as Monica Miravelez

Special participation
 Xyriel Manabat as young Mona
 Louise Abuel as young Franco
 Alyanna Angeles as young Isabelle
 Zaijian Jaranilla as young Samuel
 Ella Cruz as young Lupe
 JB Agustin as young Calixto
 Jana Agoncillo as young Natalia
 Zach Briz as young Gabriel 
 Gabrielle Patrish Nagayama as young Andrea

Book 2

Lead
 Coco Martin as Gabriel R. Hidalgo 
 Kim Chiu as Andrea Rebecca M. Hidalgo / Jacqueline "Jacq" Sanggalang
 KC Concepcion as Natalia Isabelle M. Hidalgo

Main
 Amy Austria Ventura as Isabelle Miravelez-Hidalgo / Dolores Mondigo
 Joel Torre as Samuel S. Hidalgo
 Christopher de Leon as Sen. Franco S. Hidalgo
 Rio Locsin as Guadalupe "Lupe" Roque-Dela Cruz
 Mylene Dizon as Tessa Villanueva
 Nonie Buencamino as Calixto Dela Cruz
 Smokey Manaloto as Roger Sanggalang
 Jojit Lorenzo as Mark Villanueva
 Arlene Muhlach as Esther Sanggalang

Supporting
 Dennis Padilla as Roman Evangelista
 Bryan Santos as James Lorenzo
 Mikylla Ramirez as Darlene R. Dela Cruz

Guests
 Yogo Singh as young Gabriel
 Marlann Flores as young Esther
 Neil Coleta as young Roger
 Ruby Ruiz as Marciana
 Vangie Labalan as Conchita

Reception

Ratings

Awards and nominations

Soundtrack

See also
List of programs broadcast by ABS-CBN
List of telenovelas of ABS-CBN

References

External links
 

ABS-CBN drama series
2014 Philippine television series debuts
2014 Philippine television series endings
Philippine romance television series
Television series by Dreamscape Entertainment Television
Television series set in the 1960s
Television series set in the 1970s
Television series set in the 1980s
Television series set in the 1990s
Television series set in the 2000s
Period television series
Filipino-language television shows
Television shows set in the Philippines